The 2015 IFSC Climbing World Cup was held in 13 locations. Bouldering competitions were held in 5 locations, lead in 7 locations, and speed in 5 locations. The season began on 17 May in Central Saanich, Canada and concluded on 15 November in Kranj, Slovenia.

The top 3 in each competition received medals, and the overall winners were awarded trophies. At the end of the season an overall ranking was determined based upon points, which athletes were awarded for finishing in the top 30 of each individual event.

The winners for bouldering were Jongwon Chon and Akiyo Noguchi, for lead Adam Ondra and Mina Markovič, and for speed QiXin Zhong and Mariia Krasavina, men and women respectively.

Highlights of the season 
In bouldering, at the World Cup in Munich, Shauna Coxsey of United Kingdom flashed all boulders in the final round to take the win.

In lead climbing, Janja Garnbret of Slovenia, after just turned 16 years old (the minimum age to compete in the World Cup), made her debut in the World Cup circuit by competing in lead climbing in Chamonix, France. She competed in 3 out of 7 Lead World Cups in the season and was in the top three in all competitions she attended, which made her 7th in the overall ranking in lead discipline.

In speed climbing, at the World Cup in Central Saanich, Iuliia Kaplina of Russia set a new world record of 7.74s in the semifinal round, breaking her previous world record of 7.85s which she set at the 2013 Speed World Cup in Wujiang. Then, at the World Cup in Chongqing, Iuliia Kaplina, again, set a new world record of 7.56s during qualifications, breaking her previous world record which she had set in Saanich (CAN), by as much as 0.18 seconds. Then at the World Cup in Chamonix, Iuliia Kaplina, again, set a new world record of 7.53s in the semifinal against her teammate Anna Tsyganova, breaking her previous world record by 0.03s.

France was the only nation in the top three National Team Ranking in all disciplines.

Overview

Bouldering 

An overall ranking was determined based upon points, which athletes were awarded for finishing in the top 30 of each individual event.

Men 
5 best competition results were counted (not counting points in brackets).

Women 
5 best competition results were counted (not counting points in brackets).

National Teams 
For National Team Ranking, 3 best results per competition and category were counted (not counting results in brackets).

Country names as used by the IFSC

Lead 

An overall ranking was determined based upon points, which athletes were awarded for finishing in the top 30 of each individual event.

Men 
6 best competition results were counted (not counting results in parentheses).

Women 
6 best competition results were counted (not counting results in parentheses).

National Teams 
For National Team Ranking, 3 best results per competition and category were counted (not counting results in parentheses).

Speed 

An overall ranking was determined based upon points, which athletes were awarded for finishing in the top 30 of each individual event.

Men 
5 best competition results were counted (not counting points in brackets).

Women 
5 best competition results were counted (not counting points in brackets).

National Teams 
For National Team Ranking, 3 best results per competition and category were counted (not counting results in brackets).

Combined 
5 best competition results were counted. Participation in at least 2 disciplines was required.

Men 
The results of the ten most successful athletes of the Combined World Cup 2015:

Women 
The results of the ten most successful athletes of the Combined World Cup 2015:

References

External links 

IFSC Climbing World Cup
2015 in sport climbing